The Symphony Xplorer ZV is an Android smartphone manufactured by Symphony Mobile. It was introduced in January 2015 for Bangladesh.

Features 
 Network:  2G, 3G
 SIM:  Dual SIM (Micro)
 Rear Camera: 13 MP
 Front Camera: 2 MP 
 Memory: 2 GB RAM
 Storage: 32 GB 
 Battery: 2000 mAh
 Size: 5 In
 Operating System: Android 4.4.2 KitKat
 CPU:  1.4 GHz Octa Core/MT 6592M
 Dimensions:  140 × 70 × 7.9 mm
 Sensors:  Accelerometer, Proximity, Light, G-Sensor
 Weight: 150 g
 IPS Capacitive Display
 Browser:  HTML
 GPU : Mali 450mp4

References

Android (operating system) devices
Mobile phones introduced in 2015